The  is a group of five early to middle Kofun period  megalithic tumuli located in what is now part of the town of Kōriyama, Fukushima in the southern Tōhoku region of Japan. The largest of the tumuli at the site was designated a National Historic Site of Japan in 2000.

Overview
The site is located on the east side of the Abukuma River, which flows through from the south to the north, at an altitude of about 250 meters. Discovered in 1991, the Koriyama City Board of Education conducted an excavation study from 1996 to 1998. 

It has a length of 83 meters and is orientated in a north-south direction. It was constructed by partly cutting out the natural hill next to the tumulus, with three tiers in the rear and two in the front. A large amount of red-colored pot-shaped Sue ware with a hole in the bottom was excavated from the slopes of the mound, and it was likely that these were originally kept on top of the mound. The interior has a clay-floored burial chamber with a length of 10 meters and width of two meters, containing a 9.2 meter long tree-coffin. The tomb had a large quantity of grave goods, including swords, spears, sickles, fragments of armor as well as jewelry, which date the construction to around the second half of the 4th century

The remaining four -style circular domed kofun have a diameter of approximately 15 meters each but were not well preserved. They are believed to date from the late 5th century and to be the tombs of the leaders of a nearby settlement.

The site is open to the public as an archaeological park, and is located a ten minute walk from the Kanaya bus stop on the Fukushima Kotsu bus from JR East Koriyama Station.

See also
List of Historic Sites of Japan (Fukushima)

References

External links

Oyasuba Park information home page 
Kōriyama tourist information home page 

Kofun
History of Fukushima Prefecture
Kōriyama
Historic Sites of Japan
Archaeological sites in Japan